The Nielsen Norman Group (NN/g) is an American computer user interface and user experience consulting firm, founded in 1998 by Jakob Nielsen and Don Norman. Their work includes an analysis of the interface of Microsoft's Windows 8 operating system. They have done analyses of the user experience of mobile devices (including the iPad), and intranets. As of 2000, Bruce Tognazzini joined Nielsen Norman Group as a partner.

References

External links

Companies based in Fremont, California
1998 establishments in California
Consulting firms established in 1998
User interfaces